Shurab-e Hajji (also Romanized as Shūrāb-e Ḩājjī; also known as Ḩājjī Shūrāb and Shūrāb) is a village in Qaslan Rural District, Serishabad District, Qorveh County, Kurdistan Province, Iran. At the 2006 census, its population was 484, in 110 families. The village is populated by Kurds.

References 

Towns and villages in Qorveh County
Kurdish settlements in Kurdistan Province